Frankie Byrne (May 1924 – 8 February 2019) was an Irish Gaelic footballer who played as a right wing-forward for the Meath county team.

Byrne made his senior début during the 1943 championship. He went on to play a key role during a golden age for Meath, and won one All-Ireland medal, three Leinster medals and two National League medals. He was an All-Ireland runner-up on one occasion.

Honours

Navan Parnells
Meath Senior Football Championship (1): 1946

Navan O'Mahonys
Meath Senior Football Championship (1): 1953

Meath
All-Ireland Senior Football Championship (2): 1949, 1954
Leinster Senior Football Championship (4): 1947, 1949, 1951, 1952
National Football League (2): 1945-46, 1950-51

References

1924 births
2019 deaths
Gaelic football selectors
Irish schoolteachers
Leinster inter-provincial Gaelic footballers
Meath inter-county Gaelic footballers
Winners of one All-Ireland medal (Gaelic football)